Jean-Bernard Raimond (6 February 1926 – 7 March 2016) was a conservative French politician who served as Foreign Minister in the government of Jacques Chirac from 1986 to 1988, as French ambassador to a number of states from the 1970s to the 1990s, and as a deputy in the French National Assembly from 1993 to 2002.

Biography
Educated at the elite École Normale Supérieure (graduated 1947) and the École nationale d'administration, Raimond served in a variety of civil service positions with the French government, in 1967 he became a member of the staff of Maurice Couve de Murville, at the time the French Foreign Minister, and later to Louis de Guiringaud in 1978. He was ambassador to Morocco from 1973 to 1977, to Poland (1982–1984), to the Soviet Union (1985–1986) and to the Vatican (1988–1991). In between terms as ambassador, he served in various posts in the French Foreign Ministry, including his term as Foreign Minister from 1986 to 1988.

In 1993, he was elected to the French National Assembly as deputy for Bouches-du-Rhône (Aix-en-Provence) as a member of the Neo-Gaullist Rally for the Republic (RPR), and was reelected in 1997 for a term ending in 2002.

He was very active in Franco-Moroccan relations and is a member of a number of bilateral friendship committees, participated in non-governmental international colloquia, and wrote several books. Raimond was also the recipient of a number of French and foreign honours, including Officer of the Légion d'honneur, Commander of the Ordre national du Mérite, Chevalier des Palmes Académiques, Grand-cordon du Ouissam-Alaouite (Morocco), and the Grand Cross of the Order of Pius IX (Vatican).

Bibliography
Le Quai d'Orsay à l'épreuve de la cohabitation (Flammarion, 1989) – 
Le Choix de Gorbatchev (Odile-Jacob, 1992) – 
Jean Paul II, un pape au cœur de l'histoire (Le Cherche-Midi, 1999) –

References

1926 births
2016 deaths
French Foreign Ministers
Politicians of the French Fifth Republic
Ambassadors of France to Morocco
Ambassadors of France to Poland
Ambassadors of France to the Soviet Union
Ambassadors of France to the Holy See
20th-century French diplomats
Politicians from Paris
École Normale Supérieure alumni
École nationale d'administration alumni
Knights of the Order of Pope Pius IX
Chevaliers of the Ordre des Palmes Académiques
Commanders of the Ordre national du Mérite
Commandeurs of the Légion d'honneur
Deputies of the 11th National Assembly of the French Fifth Republic